Nocardioides nitrophenolicus is a bacterium from the genus Nocardioides which has been isolated from industrial wastewater. Nocardioides nitrophenolicus has the ability to degrade p-nitrophenol.

References

Further reading 
 
 

nitrophenolicus
Bacteria described in 1999